Frank Hereford (July 4, 1825December 21, 1891) was a United States representative and Senator from West Virginia.

Early and family life

Born near Warrenton, Fauquier County, Virginia, he completed preparatory studies and graduated from McKendree University (Lebanon, Illinois) in 1845.

Career

Hereford studied law and was admitted to the Virginia bar and practiced. He moved to California in 1849 during the California Gold Rush and was district attorney of Sacramento County from 1855 to 1857.

Congress 
He moved to West Virginia and was elected as a Democrat to the Forty-second, Forty-third, and Forty-fourth Congresses and served from March 4, 1871, until January 31, 1877, when he resigned. As a Representative, he was chairman of the Committee on Commerce (Forty-fourth Congress).

Hereford was elected as a Democrat to the U.S. Senate on January 26, 1877, to fill the vacancy caused by the death of Allen Taylor Caperton, but didn't qualify until he resigned from the U.S. House of Representatives.  He served from January 31, 1877, to March 3, 1881. As a Senator, he was chairman of the Committee on Mines and Mining (Forty-sixth Congress).

After Congress 

He resumed the practice of law and died in Union, West Virginia in 1891. Interment was in Green Hill Cemetery.

References

1825 births
1891 deaths
Democratic Party United States senators from West Virginia
District attorneys in California
McKendree University alumni
West Virginia lawyers
People from Warrenton, Virginia
People from Monroe County, West Virginia
Democratic Party members of the United States House of Representatives from West Virginia
19th-century American politicians
19th-century American lawyers